The Portugal women's national volleyball team is controlled by the Federação Portuguesa de Voleibol (Portuguese Volleyball Federation) and represents Portugal in international women's volleyball competitions and friendly matches.

The team has played in many qualification tournaments but is yet to qualify for a major tournament. In 2017, it played the European League for the first time.

Results

European Volleyball League
 Champions   Runners-up   Third place   Fourth place

References

External links
Portuguese Volleyball Federation Official website 
CEV Profile 
FIVB Profile

National women's volleyball teams
Volleyball
Volleyball in Portugal